Deh-e Qazi-ye Do (also Romanized as Deh-e Qāẕī-ye Do; also known as Deh-e Kāfī and Deh-e Qāẕī) is a village in Madvarat Rural District, in the Central District of Shahr-e Babak County, Kerman Province, Iran. At the 2016 census, its population was 25, in 10 families.

References 

Populated places in Shahr-e Babak County